Gim Yu-jeong or Kim Yu-jŏng (Korean: 김유정, 11 January 1908 – 29 March 1937) was a Korean novelist. He is one of the famous novelists of Korea, also recognised as the icon of Chuncheon, where he was born. Gim You-jeong Literature Village and Gimyujeong Station, both located in Chuncheon was named after him.

Life
Gim was born in Chuncheon, Gangwon Province on January 11, 1908. He was the son of a wealthy landowner. The family fortunes, however, were squandered away by his older brother, and Gim spent much of his adolescent and adult life in poverty. After graduating Whimoon High School, Gim attended Yonhi College, now Yonsei University, in Seoul. He made his literary debut with the publication of "Wanderer Among the Hills” (Sangol nageune) in 1933 and won short fiction contests held by Chosun Ilbo and Chosun joongang Ilbo two years later. In 1935, he became a member of the literary coterie, The Society of Nine (Gu-inhoe), which included such prominent poets and fiction writers as Jeong Jiyong and Lee Sang. He has left us with some thirty stories, most of them published in 1935 and 1936. He died of pulmonary tuberculosis on March 29, 1937.

Work
Gim's work was described as "rich and earthy". He wrote approximately 30 short stories, most of which were published in the three years before his death. His 1936 story The Camellias (동백꽃) is about the residents of a Korean farming village; its implicit sexuality was more explicit in his 1935 Rain shower (소낙비). His 1937 story The scorching heat was considered gloomy.

The prototypical Gim Yujeong protagonist might be the narrator of “Spring, Spring” (Bom bom, 1935), a simpleton who is slow to realize that his wily future father-in-law is exploiting his labor, or the husband in “Scorching Sun” (Ttaengbyeot), too ignorant to know that his wife's illness is actually due to an overgrown baby in her womb. Bawdy dialogue and colloquial slang heighten the comic potential of such situations, but an undercurrent of sadness suggests the wretchedness of poverty-stricken lives. Embedded within Gim Yujeong's lyrical approach to nature and robust characterization of peasant wholesomeness are indirect references to questions of class. Conflicts between tenants and middlemen, as well as the problem of absentee landlordism which rose sharply as a result of Japanese agricultural policy hint at the dark and bleak reality of rural Korea in 1930s.

Gim engages the structural contradictions of rural Korean society at a more explicit level in “A Rainy Spell” (Sonakbi) and “Scoundrels” (Manmubang). Both the husband in “A Rainy Spell” and the older brother in “Scoundrels” are dislocated farmers who must drift about after losing their tenancy. In an atmosphere of overwhelming hopelessness and despair, where back-breaking work only leads peasants deeper and deeper into debt, both characters turn to gambling in search of making a quick profit. The husband in “A Rainy Spell” encourages his wife's sexual union with a wealthy old man for money, and the older brother in “Scoundrels” parts with his wife and child altogether to find means of survival. The speculative spirit which extreme poverty fosters among peasants also manifests itself as gold fever in “Bonanza” (Nodaji, 1935) and “Plucking Gold in a Field of Beans” (Geum ttaneun kongbat). Though most of his stories are sketches of rural communities in decline, Gim also turned his attention to the plight of the urban poor in such stories as “Wretched Lives” (Ttaraji).

The World of Works 
Kim Yoo-jeong's novel is interesting in that it treats warm love for humans artistically and interestingly. The love that can hold many people in one string and the love that connects their hearts and hearts to each other is interestingly illustrated by the skill of our traditional folk art. However, just because literature of a folk character is rooted in the love of the people, his works do not hang on to popular interest or low-level comedy. Kim Yoo-jeong's novels are characterized by humor and sorrow, so to speak, that the stupidity or ignorance of the characters often induces laughter, which leads to their own poor and miserable real life and instills deep sorrow.

Works in Translation
 Camellias (1936)
 The Golden Bean Patch (available free from LTI Korea)

Works in Korean (Partial)
 "Wanderer Among the Hills” (Sangol nageune, 1933) 
 “Spring, Spring” (1935)
 “Scorching Sun” (Ttaengbyeot)
 “A Rainy Spell” (Sonakbi)
 “Scoundrels” (Manmubang)
 “Bonanza” (Nodaji, 1935)
 “Plucking Gold in a Field of Beans” (Geum ttaneun kongbat)
 “Wretched Lives” (Ttaraji)
 “Camellia Flower”(Dongbaek Kkot, 1936)

Gim You-jeong Literature Village
Gim You-jeong Literature Village is founded to honor the spirit and literature by restoring her birth home and building exhibition hall on August 6, 2002. Gim Yu-jeong memorial society held events such as Gim Yu-jeong memorial ceremony, research meeting, literal festival for teenager and so on. Opening hours is 9:30~17:00 in winter season and 9:00~18:00 in summer season. In addition, you can request commentary, but you have to submit application form before at least one week.

See also
Gimyujeong Station

References
Notes

Sources

 Modern Korean Literature (2012)

External links

Korean novelists
People from Chuncheon
Whimoon High School alumni
Yonsei University alumni
1908 births
1937 deaths
Yi Sang
20th-century novelists
20th-century deaths from tuberculosis
Tuberculosis deaths in South Korea